Svein Morten Johansen (born 29 May 1971) is a retired Norwegian football defender.

He hails from Tromsdalen and played his entire career in Tromsdalen UIL before joining first-tier club Tromsø IL ahead of the 1992 season. He played for Tromsø until 2003.

Johansen was managing director of Tromsdalen director of sports in Tromsø.

References

1971 births
Living people
Sportspeople from Tromsø
Norwegian footballers
Tromsdalen UIL players
Tromsø IL players
Eliteserien players
Norwegian sports executives and administrators
Association football defenders